The EuroRhythms, also known as Ray Massa's EuroRhythms, are an Italian-American band from Columbus, Ohio.  They generally play traditional Italian folk music, and Italian swing. The band is touring group/musical variety act, performing  the United States since 1992. Their music is dubbed as old Italian popular music rewritten with a new pop sound. Their audience tends to consist of both youth looking for new Italian culture, and older Italians who appreciate the older tunes.

History
In 1992 founder Ray Massa, formed a professional Italian-American band. He is the son of John and Carmela Massa, who immigrated to the US. 

Since its founding, the band has consisted of 8 members. They spend their time touring Italian festivals, and performing for youth. In 2008, the band was invited to tour various cities within Italy.

Notable performances
Seattle Festa Italiana, Seattle, Washington.
Italian Festival, Columbus, Ohio.
Italian Day, Kennywood Park, Pittsburgh, Pennsylvania.
Festa Italiana, Portland, Oregon.
Festa Italiana, Virginia Beach, Virginia.
Festa Italiana, Wisconsin.

External links
Official EuroRhythms website

Italian-American culture in Ohio
Italian musical groups
Culture of Columbus, Ohio